Baie de Briande is a bay in La Croix-Valmer, on the French Riviera  south of Saint-Tropez. The bay is used by tourists.

History

The  is a prehistoric dolmen located 300m inland.

Allied forces landed at the bay in August 1944 as part of Operation Dragoon, the invasion of southern France during World War II.

Cap Taillat, the headland at the eastern end of the bay, was used for filming the 1968 film Chitty Chitty Bang Bang.

References

Populated coastal places in France